Daazvirus is a genus of viruses in the realm Ribozyviria, containing the single species Daazvirus cynopis.

Host 
The Chinese fire belly newt (Cynops orientalis) serves as its host.

References 

Virus genera
Monotypic genera